Collin Graham Schiffli is an American film director, producer and editor. He has directed the independent films Animals, All Creatures Here Below and Die in a Gunfight.

Early life 
Schiffli was born in Fort Wayne, Indiana. He is the middle of three sons; his older brother, Brandon, is a screenwriter and script supervisor. Schiffli attended Carroll High School (Fort Wayne, Indiana) and graduated with a Bachelor of Arts in Film from Columbia College Chicago in 2009. Soon after, Schiffli moved to Los Angeles to pursue a career in film.

Career 
Schiffli began his career writing and directing the short film Johnny Appleseed, Johnny Appleseed (2008). His next two shorts, Head Case (2009) and Band (2010), starred his good friend and frequent collaborator, actor David Dastmalchian. Schiffli directed two more short films, Shortcake (2012) and Elias the Ant (2013).

Schiffli made his feature directorial debut with Animals (2014). The film was written and produced by David Dastmalchian and stars him and Kim Shaw as two heroin addicts in Chicago. Animals won the Special Jury Award for Courage in Filmmaking at the SXSW Film Festival, and received positive reviews from critics following its release in theaters and on video on demand platforms; A. O. Scott of The New York Times stated that Schiffli "shoots in a fluid style, tweaking colors and focus to register changes in perception and feeling". Steve Dollar of The Wall Street Journal praised the director for keeping "a tight focus on character, as the couple's plight becomes increasingly dire".
 
Schiffli's next feature, All Creatures Here Below (2018), is about a runaway couple (Dastmalchian and Karen Gillan) heading towards their hometown of Kansas City. After its world premiere at the Downtown Film Festival Los Angeles, the film was released theatrically by Samuel Goldwyn Films in the spring of 2019, and garnered a positive reception; Dennis Harvey of Variety opined that "Schiffli directs with a nice balance between momentum and naturalism", while Katie Walsh of the Los Angeles Times appreciated the director's "beautiful and unobtrusive style".
 
Schiffli's latest film, Die in a Gunfight (2021), starring Alexandra Daddario, Diego Boneta, Justin Chatwin and Travis Fimmel, is described as an updated version of William Shakespeare's Romeo and Juliet. Released in the summer by Lionsgate, the film received mostly negative from critics; Christy Lemire of RogerEbert.com gave the film 0.5 out of 4 stars and stated, "Schiffli's snarky and snide self-aware tone quickly grows wearisome, and his action sequences have a cheapness about them that's distancing". In contrast, Mark Hughes of Forbes gave the film a positive review and stated, "[A] sleek, subversive, lushly fun action-crime thriller. One of the better films inspired by Romeo and Juliet, its a welcome addition to the director's résumé and deserves to find an audience".

Filmography

As director

As producer

As editor

As screenwriter

Awards and nominations

References

External links 

Living people
American film directors
American film editors
American film producers
Columbia College Chicago alumni
People from Fort Wayne, Indiana
Year of birth missing (living people)